Estyn is the education and training inspectorate for Wales. Its name comes from the Welsh language verb estyn meaning "to reach (out), stretch or extend". Its function is to provide an independent inspection and advice service on quality and standards in education and training provided in Wales.

It is independent from, but funded by, the Welsh Government (section 104 of the Government of Wales Act 1998). His Majesty's Chief Inspector of Education and Training in Wales (HMCI) and her staff are Crown and civil servants.

Meilyr Rowlands was appointed as HM Chief Inspector of Education and Training in Wales (HMCI) on 1 June 2015.

The strategic directors are Simon Brown HMI and Claire Morgan HMI.

The purpose of Estyn is to inspect and report on the quality and standards of education and training provided in Wales, including:
 how far education and training meet the needs of learners and contribute to their development and wellbeing;
 standards achieved; and
 the quality of leadership and training.

Estyn's head office is in Cardiff.  Estyn was awarded Investors in People Gold (IIP) accreditation in March 2011 and was re-awarded IIP Gold in 2018.

The equivalent body in Scotland is Education Scotland and in England it is Ofsted.

Range of inspection

Estyn inspects the following:

 nursery schools and settings that are maintained by, or receive funding from, local authorities;
 primary schools;
 secondary schools;
 special schools;
 pupil referral units;
 independent schools;
 further education;
 independent specialist colleges;
 adult community learning;
 local authority education services for children and young people;
 regional consortia for school improvement;
 teacher education and training;
 Welsh for adults;
 work-based learning; and
 learning in the justice sector.

Inspection reports are published on the Estyn website.

Objectives

Strategic objectives
Estyn's strategic objectives are:

Provide public accountability to service users on the quality and standards of education and training provision in Wales;
Inform the development of national policy by the Welsh Government; and
Build capacity in the delivery of education and training in Wales.

Estyn works in collaboration with the Care and Social Services Inspectorate for Wales (CSSIW), Healthcare Inspectorate Wales (HIW) and Wales Audit Office (WAO) to implement the Welsh Government's policy statement on Inspection, Audit and Regulation. In partnership with Ofsted, Estyn has responsibility for inspecting learners in England who are funded by the Welsh Government and who attend independent special schools, work-based learning courses, and provision for young people in youth offending teams. Estyn inspects, through joint working with HMI Probation and HMI Prisons, the education of offenders in secure estate and prisons in Wales.

See also
 Education in Wales

Footnotes

Education in Cardiff
Educational organisations based in Wales